Milo Schoenmaker (born 17 November 1967 in Alkmaar) is a Dutch politician for the People's Party for Freedom and Democracy (VVD). Since 2012 he is the Mayor of Gouda.

References

1967 births
Living people
Mayors in South Holland
People's Party for Freedom and Democracy politicians
Dutch civil servants
People from Alkmaar